The Luncșoara is a right tributary of the river Hălmăgel in Romania. It flows into the Hălmăgel in the village Hălmăgel.

References

Rivers of Romania
Rivers of Arad County